Asplundia quinindensis is a species of plant in the Cyclanthaceae family. It is endemic to Ecuador.  Its natural habitats are subtropical or tropical moist lowland forests and subtropical or tropical moist montane forests.

References

quinindensis
Endemic flora of Ecuador
Vulnerable flora of South America
Taxonomy articles created by Polbot